Anton Bubnow (born 23 November 1988) is a Belarusian professional footballer who plays for Molodechno.

Career
Born in Slonim, Bubnow began playing football in FC MTZ-RIPO's youth system. He joined the senior side (now known as FC Partizan Minsk) and made his Belarusian Premier League debut in 2007.

Bubnow played for Belarus at the 2005 UEFA European Under-17 Championship.

Honours
MTZ-RIPO Minsk
Belarusian Cup winner: 2007–08

References

External links

1988 births
Living people
Belarusian footballers
Association football midfielders
FC Partizan Minsk players
FC Gorodeya players
FC Isloch Minsk Raion players
FC Belshina Bobruisk players
FC Molodechno players
People from Slonim
Sportspeople from Grodno Region